Seletkan is a rural locality (a selo) and the administrative center of Seletkansky Selsoviet of Shimanovsky District, Amur Oblast, Russia. The population was 278 as of 2018. There are 9 streets.

Geography 
Seletkan is located on the Bolshaya Pyora River, 30 km southeast of Shimanovsk (the district's administrative centre) by road. Malinovka is the nearest rural locality.

References 

Rural localities in Shimanovsky District